Pelomonas aquatica is a Gram-negative, rod-shaped, non-spore-forming bacterium from the genus Pelomonas in the family  Comamonadaceae. Colonies of P. aquatica are yellowish in color and dark and opaque.

References

External links
Type strain of Pelomonas aquatica at BacDive -  the Bacterial Diversity Metadatabase

Comamonadaceae
Bacteria described in 2005